Bellerophon is a hero in Greek mythology.

Bellerophon may also refer to:

Arts and entertainment
 Bellerophon (play), an ancient Greek play by Euripides
 Bellérophon, an opera by Jean-Baptiste Lully first performed in 1679
 Bellerophon, a fictional starship in the movie Forbidden Planet
 Bellerophon, a fictional virus antidote in the film Mission: Impossible 2
 Bellerophon, a fictional moon in Joss Whedon's Firefly universe, see List of Firefly planets and moons
 An episode of State of Affairs (TV series)
 A slower than light ship in the Andromeda TV series (S03E05, The Lone And Level Sands) by Gene Roddenberry

Locomotives
 Bellerophon (GWR Premier Class locomotive), built 1846
 Bellerophon (Haydock Foundry locomotive), built 1874
 Bellerophon (GWR 3031 Class locomotive), built 1894
 Bellerophon (LMS Jubilee Class locomotive) built 1936

Ships
 Bellerophon-class battleship, a class of British battleships
 HMS Bellerophon, six ships of the Royal Navy
 USS Bellerophon (disambiguation)

Science and technology
 Bellerophon (mollusc), a genus of Paleozoic mollusc in the family Bellerophontidae
 51 Pegasi b, nicknamed Bellerophon, the first exosolar planet discovered around a main sequence star
 Bellerophon program, a program to detect chimeric sequences
 1808 Bellerophon, an asteroid